is a two-part original video animation based on the video game series of the same name. Released in 1996, the film is based primarily on the events of Battle Arena Toshinden 2, but incorporates elements from the first and third games in the series.

Plot

Part 1
In the final round of the Battle Arena Toshinden tournament, Eiji Shinjo faces the tournament's sponsor, Gaia, in a final duel. Gaia mentions that Eiji's skills are comparable to those of his long-lost brother, Sho, but before he can explain, the fight is interrupted by a man called Chaos, who works for the same Organization as Gaia and has been sent to eliminate him upon discovering that Gaia is rallying fighters to overthrow the Organization. Gaia slays Chaos and flees, leaving the tournament without a winner.

A year later, both Sho and Chaos, the latter having apparently survived his fight with Gaia, working for the Organization's leader, Lady Uranus, begin hunting down the fighters from the tournament, such as Fo Fai, Rungo Iron and Mondo. Eiji, along with his best friend Kayin Amoh, split up to warn the other competitors. Eiji meets up with Sofia, an amnesiac agent and personal friend of his, and explains the situation to her. That night, however, Uranus takes control of Sofia's mind and has her try to kill Eiji, but Eiji fights back and breaks Uranus's hold on her. Sho himself then appears and does battle with Eiji, quickly gaining the upper hand, but Eiji discovers that Sho is actually a machine and overpowers him. Uranus appears and destroys Sho, goading Eiji before taking her leave. Enraged, Eiji vows to take Uranus and the Organization down.

Part 2
Eiji and Kayin meet up with another competitor, Ellis, and warn her of the danger. Believing she may be slain, Eiji and Kayin set a trap for Chaos and surprise him when he arrives. Gaia appears and fights Chaos again, and in the process, Ellis deduces from Gaia's pendant that Gaia is her long-lost father. Chaos blinds Gaia with gas and aims poison-tipped darts at him, but Ellis jumps in the way and is poisoned. Chaos smugly informs them that only the Organization has the antidote and flees back to the base, knowing that Gaia will likely seek him and Uranus out in revenge. After Ellis is hospitalised, Eiji, Kayin, Gaia and Sofia, with help from a policewoman, Tracy, launch an all-out assault on Uranus's base, aided by Rungo, Fo, Mondo and Duke, the other fighters from the tournament. Gaia locates and fights Chaos again while Eiji finds and destroys the facility where the copies of Sho are being created. Eiji and Kayin aid Gaia and eventually destroy Chaos once and for all. They confront Uranus in the throne room, where Uranus tells them that the facility was only a decoy, and the true one is beneath the base. The real Sho appears and defies Uranus, informing her that he has destroyed the real facility, which has caused the base to start collapsing. After swearing revenge, Uranus flees. Eiji, Kayin and Gaia make it out of the base before it explodes, but Sho is nowhere to be found.

The participants part ways on good terms. In a secluded area, Sho, who also survived, silently compliments his brother's improved skills. Meanwhile, Eiji and Kayin deliver the antidote to Ellis and she makes a full recovery. As Eiji walks home, he is confronted by a mysterious, gun-wielding warrior, Vermillion, and the film ends as they prepare to fight.

Cast

Release
In the North America market, Central Park Media released the anime on VHS in two versions: an uncut version and an edited PG-13 version, with the latter omitting the nudity and graphic content of the former. The Region 1 DVD releases are of the uncut version only.

References

External links 

 
 

1996 anime OVAs
Battle Arena Toshinden
OVAs based on video games
Martial arts anime and manga
Works based on Sony Interactive Entertainment video games
J.C.Staff
Anime film and television articles using incorrect naming style